The Toronto Rock are a lacrosse team based in Toronto playing in the National Lacrosse League (NLL). The 2019 season is the 22nd in franchise history, and 21st as the Rock.

Regular season

Final standings

Game log

Regular season

Playoffs

Roster

See also
2019 NLL season

References

Toronto
Toronto Rock
2019 in Canadian sports